"Iron Hand" is a song by the rock band Dire Straits released on their album On Every Street in 1991. The song also appeared on the compilation album Nintendo: White Knuckle Scorin' in the same year of its release. It relates to the Battle of Orgreave during the UK miners' strike, with Mark Knopfler remarking on how the police charge on horseback into the crowd of striking miners had reminded him of the savagery of medieval times.

References

Dire Straits songs
Songs written by Mark Knopfler
1991 songs
Song recordings produced by Mark Knopfler
UK miners' strike (1984–1985)